"You're My Mate" is a song by English pop group Right Said Fred released as the second single from their fourth album Fredhead. It was based on their best friend Jordan Smith from the Cotswold. The song is co-written with Myke Gray, a hard rock guitarist formerly of UFO, Jagged Edge, and Skin

The single reached number 18 on the UK Singles Chart, their first top 20 single in the country since their 1993 single "Stick It Out."

Music video
The music video features the band performing the track with bagpipes played by scantily clad female dancers against a white background.

Track listing
UK CD single

 "You're My Mate" (Unplugged Mix)
 "You're My Mate"

Charts

Weekly charts

Year-end charts

References

2001 singles
2001 songs
Right Said Fred songs
Songs written by Richard Fairbrass
Songs written by Fred Fairbrass